Small Pleasures is a historical romance novel written by author Clare Chambers. It was longlisted for the 2021 Women's Prize for Fiction , and featured on the BBC's talk show Between The Covers as a Book of the Week Pick.

Plot 
Set in 1957, the novel follows Jean Swinney, journalist for a local newspaper who investigates the claim of a woman who says her daughter was the result of a virgin birth.

Awards and nominations 
The book was longlisted for the 2021 Women's Prize for Fiction.

Promotion 
The book was promoted on Sara Cox's BBC talk show Between The Covers as a 'Book of the Week Pick'.

References 

2020 British novels
British romance novels
Weidenfeld & Nicolson books
Fiction set in 1957
Novels set in the 1950s
Novels about journalists